Visaal is a 2018 Urdu-language Pakistani television series, airs on every Wednesday on ARY Digital. It is written by Hashim Nadeem and directed Ali Hassan. Zahid Ahmed and Hania Amir are playing the lead characters, along with Saboor Aly. Along with Khasara and Bayardi, it was one of the most popular ARY digital dramas of 2018.

Plot
Akram (Zahid Ahmed) is a street boy who, after being threatened by the police to leave his actions, leaves Hyderabad for Karachi to start a new life, where he pretends to be very religious and thus befriends a religious scholar Mufti Ghufran (Firdous Jamal). One day, when Akram goes to Ghufran's house to meet him, he sees a very beautiful girl who he assumes to be Ghufran's daughter, and from that day onwards, Akku starts being even nicer to Ghufran so that he can marry his daughter. The truth is that the girl Akram saw at Ghufran's house was actually Pari (Hania Amir), who is the best friend of Ghufran's daughter Naheed. Soon, Ghufran has Akram engaged to Naheed but Akku does not get the chance to see her and thinks he is engaged to the girl he saw.

Meanwhile Pari lives in a house with her father and the two share a very loving relationship. Pari's father's young boss, Taimoor (Agha Mustafa) falls in love with Pari, and Naheed becomes jealous of the wealthy proposal Pari has got as Naheed's own fiancé is Akku, so she plots to ruin Pari's reputation and locks Pari with Taimoor so that people see them together and assume that they were committing some sinful activity. Pari is defamed, but Naheed later regrets betraying her friend. Akku and Naheed marry, and when Akku discovers he married the wrong girl, he is horrified, but decides to use Naheed as a weapon to acquire Pari.

Things take a drastic turn when Pari's father Shabeer is stabbed by some of his enemies in the middle of the night. Pari desperately tries to find someone to help her, and fate has it, that she sees Akram and suddenly holds his hand, pleading for help. The girl Akram was unable to find for so long suddenly comes on front of him and holds his hand which gives him the most magical moment of his life. Pari's father is hospitalised, and along with Naheed and her father, Akram frequently visits the hospital. He even pays all the hospital bills which makes Pari grateful to him. Pari's father Shabeer finally passes away, leaving Pari shattered. Since Pari has no family, Naheed shifts her to her with her (Naheed's) parents where Akram often comes to see if Pari is okay or if she needs anything. Akram really helps her during her tough time. Also, Akram discovers that the person who ruined Pari's life was none other than the evil Naheed. Now its up to Akram to save Pari's dignity and see that Naheed is punished for her sin.

Pari receives a proposal from a good family, but when the family finds out about Pari's defamation, the cancel the wedding, and the rejection breaks Pari's heart once again. Akram reveals to Naheed that he is aware of how Naheed back-stabbed Pari and threatens to reveal it to everyone unless Naheed has Akram married Pari. Naheed wants Pari to marry Taimoor because she thinks that Pari deserves a perfect man like Taimoor and she tricks Akram by saying Pari rejected the proposal but Akram tells her to keep telling Pari that Akram is the one who can save her dignity.

Naheed realizes that if she tries to win Akram's heart, he will forget Pari and everyone will be able to live peacefully. So she, for the first time, talks to him politely and tries to sexually attract him but Akram makes it very clear that he only wants Pari. The next idea that comes to Naheed's mind is to poison hers as well as Akram's food so that they both would die and Pari could finally regain her happiness.

Naheed dies. However, Akram, realizing that Naheed has poisoned the food and is breathing her last, saying that she wants to end herself and Akram to bring peace to Pari's life, Akram drinks a lot of water and vomits, thus reducing the efficiency of the poison. The neighborhood people see the faint couple and rush them to the hospital where Naheed dies and Akram survives. Before dying, Naheed had left a letter for Pari, confessing all her sins. Pari is heartbroken at the demise of the girl she considered her sister. Akram had faked his identity and soon after being discharged from the hospital, he is jailed, along with Doodhpatti. However, they are soon bailed.

Pari is convinced that she must marry to finally be able to live in peace, and she chooses her own groom ---Akku's servant Munna. Mufti Ghufran does not approve of the union because Pari is very educated and Munna is illiterate, but Pari is determined to marry Munna. The true reason is that she wants to hurt Akku by marrying his servant. Pari's marriage date is fixed. However, a twist of turn shows Taimoor returning to Pari's life. Taimoor is on an even higher post now and wants to settle down with Pari as his wife. Akku learns of Pari's two suitors and is determined to eliminate both Munna and Taimoor to finally marry his love.

Pari rejects Taimoor's proposal saying that it is too late now and that she is now engaged to Munna, but Taimoor requests to meet Pari for one last time to apologize to her and to find peace in the apology. Pari agrees to meet him, on one condition: that Munna would be present at the meeting. However, Pari's persistent babysitter Jumman Bua forces her to go their without even informing Munna. Akku learns of the meeting and brainwashes Munna, saying that Pari is cheating on him, and tells Munna that he should punish Pari by killing Taimoor. Akku hands Munna a fully loaded gun. Munna goes to kill Taimoor, but he overhears Pari and Taimoor's conversation in which Pari clearly tells Taimoor that she has chosen Munna over him because Munna has supported her in her worst times and says she will stay loyal to Munna. Munna is deeply touched by this. He later meets Taimoor and Molvi Ghufran and tells Molvi Ghufran to reunite Taimoor and Pari, and breaks off his own engagement. Munna disappears shortly afterwards. Akku cannot accept his defeat and this unleashes his utmost negative side.

Finally, it is Pari's mehendi ceremony, where Akku shows up, crying and begging for Pari's love. He tries to touch Pari's cheek while saying "Pari, meri pyaari Pari!" (meaning Pari, my beloved Pari). However, before he can touch her cheek, Akku is shot all of a sudden. Munna is revealed to have shot Akku in order to protect Pari. Akku dies saying "Aashiqui sabar talab, aur tamanna betaab, dil ka kya rang karoon, khoon-e-jigar honay tak" (meaning Love demands endurance while desire is consuming. What should be my state until obsession devours patience).

Six months pass and Taimoor and Pari are shown as a very happily married couple.

Cast
Zahid Ahmed as Akram "Akku" : a man who is good at heart, such as he helps the poor people, but his obsession with Pari makes him go to any length to have her. 
Hania Amir as Pari : an innocent girl who lives a peaceful, lovely life with her father and dreams of becoming an officer until her life is ruined by Naheed.
Saboor Aly as Naheed: Pari's childhood friend who ruins Pari's life because of sheer jealousy. She later commits suicide because of her guilt.
Ismat Zaidi : Jumman Bua, Pari's babysitter
Tauqeer Nasir as Shabeer: Pari's father 
Firdous Jamal as Maulvi Ghufran, Naheed's father
Saife Hassan as Dilbar/Akku's fake brother Azam 
Waleed Zaidi as Dhoodhpatti, Akram's best friend . Dhoodhpatti was a thief, but Akram gives him a job at his cosmetics shop.
Agha Mustafa Hassan as Taimoor: a young officer who falls in love with Pari. Later becomes Pari's husband
Nazar ul Hassan as Tariq "Munna": a poor man who, despite his bachelor's degree, is unable to find a job, so Akram supports him and gives him a job at his cosmetic's shop. Munna becomes Pari's fiancé but later leaves her to reunite her with Taimoor and kills Akku.

Awards and nominations

References

External links 
 http://www.tv.com.pk/tvshow/Kabhi-Kabhi/191

2018 Pakistani television series debuts
Urdu-language television shows
Pakistani drama television series